Gymnastics events have been staged at the Olympic Games since 1896. Canadian female gymnasts have participated in every Summer Olympics since 1956, except for 1980. A total of 56 female gymnasts have represented Canada. Canadian women have not won any medals at the Olympics. Teresa McDonnell and Ellie Black are the only Canadian female gymnasts who have competed in at least three Olympics.

Gymnasts

Summer Olympics

Youth Olympic Games

References

Gymnasts
Canada
Olympic